The 2015 İstanbul Cup (also known as the TEB BNP Paribas İstanbul Cup for sponsorship reasons) was a tennis tournament played on outdoor hard courts. It was the 8th edition of the İstanbul Cup, and part of the WTA International tournaments of the 2015 WTA Tour. It took place in İstanbul, Turkey, from July 20 through July 27, 2015.

Points and prize money

Prize money

Singles main-draw entrants

Seeds

 Rankings are as of July 13, 2015.

Other entrants
The following players received wildcards into the singles main draw:
  Çağla Büyükakçay 
  Alizé Cornet
  İpek Soylu

The following players received entry from the qualifying draw:
  Kateryna Bondarenko
  Margarita Gasparyan
  Jeļena Ostapenko
  Alexandra Panova
  Olga Savchuk
  Anna Tatishvili

Withdrawals 
Before the tournament
  Belinda Bencic → replaced by  Yaroslava Shvedova
  Alexandra Dulgheru → replaced by  Yanina Wickmayer
  Kristina Mladenovic → replaced by  Kirsten Flipkens
  Monica Niculescu → replaced by  Elizaveta Kulichkova
  Flavia Pennetta → replaced by  Vitalia Diatchenko

Retirements 
  Anna Tatishvili

Doubles main-draw entrants

Seeds 

 1 Rankings as of July 6, 2015.

Other entrants 
The following pairs received wildcards into the doublesmain draw:
  Ayla Aksu /  Melis Sezer 
  Anett Kontaveit /  Elizaveta Kulichkova

The following pair received entry as alternates:
  Daria Gavrilova /  Elina Svitolina

Withdrawals 
Before the tournament
  Anna Tatishvili

Champions

Singles

 Lesia Tsurenko def.  Urszula Radwańska, 7–5, 6–1

Doubles

 Daria Gavrilova /  Elina Svitolina def.  Çağla Büyükakçay /  Jelena Janković, 5–7, 6–1, [10–4]

References

External links
 Official website

2015 in Istanbul
Istanbul Cup
Istanbul Cup
İstanbul Cup
İstanbul Cup